The Budapest School was a school of thought, originally of Marxist humanism, but later of post-Marxism and dissident liberalism that emerged in Hungary in the early 1960s, belonging to so-called Hungarian New Left. Its members were students or colleagues of Georg Lukács. The school was originally oriented towards developing Lukacs' later works on social ontology and aesthetics, but quickly began to challenge the paradigm of Lukacsian-Marxism, thus reconstructing contemporary critical theory.  Most of the members later came to abandon Marxism. The school also critiqued the "dictatorship over needs" of the Soviet states. Most of the members were forced into exile by the pro-Soviet Hungarian government.

In a letter to The Times Literary Supplement  February 15, 1971, Georg Lukács drew attention to "The Budapest School of Marxism", and helped attract attention to the school from Western Marxism.

Members of the school include Ágnes Heller, Ferenc Fehér, György Márkus, István Mészáros, Mihály Vajda, and Maria Márkus, among others. The Budapest School's writings have been read and researched widely since the 1960s.

History
The 1956 Hungarian Revolution was one of the most important political events of Agnes Heller's life, for at this time she saw the effect of the academic freedoms of Marxist critical theory as dangerous to the entire political and social structure of Hungary. The uprising confirmed Heller's ideas that what Karl Marx really intended is for the people to have political autonomy and collective determination of social life.

Lukács, Heller, and other Marxist critical theorists emerged from the Revolution with the belief that Marxism and socialism needed to be applied to different nations in individual ways, effectively questioning the role of the Soviet Union in Hungary's future. These ideas set Heller on an ideological collision course with the new Moscow-supported government of János Kádár. Heller was again expelled from the Communist Party and she was dismissed from the university in 1958 for refusing to indict Lukács as a collaborator in the Revolution.  
   
From 1963 can be seen the emergence of what would later be called the Budapest School, a philosophical forum that was formed by Lukács to promote the renewal of Marxist criticism in the face of actually existing socialism and its theories. Other participants in the Budapest School included together with Heller her second husband Ferenc Fehér, György Márkus, Mihály Vajda, and some other scholars with looser connections to the school (such as András Hegedüs, István Eörsi, János Kis, and György Bence). The school emphasized the idea of the renaissance of Marxism, described by radical philosophy scholar Simon Tormey as "a flowering of the critical, oppositional potential they believed lay within Marxism and in particular within the 'early Marx' ... the Marxism of the individual 'rich in needs,' of solidarity and self-governance ... they hoped to precipitate a crisis in those systems that had the temerity to call themselves 'socialist'."

The Budapest School carried out research on the political economy of both the Soviet Union and Western capitalism. The school accepted many of the critiques of Soviet planning and inefficiency from Neoclassical Economics, as well as the connection between markets and freedom. The Soviet system was condemned as a dictatorship over needs. The school also analyzed the mixed economies of modern capitalism. Most traditional Marxist economics was jettisoned. Sweden and the Nordic Model was held as a model of the mixed economy and managed capitalism. The school advocated Radical Democracy as a solution to the authoritarian and undemocratic features of the mixed economy.

Lukács’ death in 1971 deprived the members of the Budapest School of the degree of protection he had been able to offer against an increasingly hostile regime, and in 1973 the Communist Party officially condemned their work and the members of the group were dismissed from their academic positions.

See also 

 Ágnes Heller
 György Márkus
 Maria Márkus
 István Mészáros
 Mihály Vajda

References and further reading
 A. Hegedus, M. Vajda, and others, “Die neue Linke in Ungarn”, Vol. 2., Internationale Marxistische Diskussion No.53, Merve Verlag, [West] Berlin, 1976.
 A. Hegedus, M. Markus, and others, “Die neue Linke in Ungarn”，Internationale Marxistische Diskussion No.45, Merve Verlag, [West] Berlin, 1974.
 Agnes Heller, “Preface to A Study of Agnes Heller’s Thoughts on Aesthetic Modernity by Fu Qilin”, Comparative literature: east & west, 2007, num. 8
 Arato, Andrew. “The Budapest School and actually existing socialism”, Theory and Society, no.16, 1987.593-619.
 Blechman, Max. “Revolutionary Romanticism: A Reply to Agnes Heller”, in  Radical Philosophy, no. 99(2000), 40–43.
 Brown, Doug. “Karl Polanyi’s Influence on the Budapest School”, Journal of Economic Issues, Mar 1987, vol.21, no. 1.339-347.
 Burnheim, John, ed. The Social Philosophy of Agnes Heller. Amsterdam: Rodopi, 1994.
 Charles Andras, “New Left in Hungary Attracts Attention of Western Marxists”, RAD Background Report/91，(East-West), 23 April 1976.
 Coop, Barry. “A Philosophy of History in Fragments, Agnes Heller”, in
 Despoix, Phillippe. “On the Possibility of a Philosophy of Values: A Dialogue Within the Budapest School”, in John Burnheim, ed. The Social Philosophy of Agnes Heller. Amsterdam: Rodopi, 1994.
 Falk, Barbara J. The Dilemmas of Dissidence in East-Central Europe：Citizen Intellectuals and Philosopher Kings. Budapest: Central European University Press, 2003.
 Frankel, Serge and Daniel Martin. “The Budapest School,” Telos 17 (Fall 1973).
 Fu Qilin, “Agnes Heller’s thoughts on aesthetic modernity”, Review of China Books, 2007, num.3.
 Fu Qilin ed, Agnes Heller, “Reflection on the postmodern art”, Journal of Sichuan University, 2007, num.5
 Fu Qilin, “A Study of Agnes Heller’s Thoughts on Aesthetic Modernity :Abstract”, Comparative literature: east & west, 2007, num.8
 Fu Qilin, “Agnes Heller’s analysis of aesthetic modernity in Renaissance”, Journal of Langfang teachers’ college, 2010, num.2
 Fu Qilin, “Budapest School’s way to post-Marxist”, Cultural Studies and Literary Theory, 2008, num.18
 Fu Qilin, “on Budapest School’s critique of Frankfurt School’s aesthetics”, Literary Theory and Studies, 2009, num.2
 Fu Qilin, “On Budapest School’s critique of György Lukács ’ totality aesthetics", Research on Marxist Aesthetics, 2008, num.11.
 Fu Qilin, “On Budapest School’s Critique of Institution Theory of Art”, Journal of Center South University, 2005, num.3
 Fu Qilin, “On Budapest School’s Reconstructing Aesthetics”, Studies of Foreign Literature, 2004, num.2.
 Fu Qilin, “on Budapest School’s study of influence of market on cultural distribution”, Journal of Langfang Teachers' College, 2007, num.4
 Fu Qilin, “Reconstructing the concept of art and interpreting the postmodern arts: A summary of Agnes Heller’s lectures  on the academic journey to China”, Modern Philosophy, 2008, num.4
 Fu Qilin, A Study of Agnes Heller's Thoughts about Aesthetic Modernity. Chengdu, China: Bashu Publishing House, 2006.
 Fu Qilin, Critique of Grand Narrative and the Construction of Pluralist Aesthetics: A Study of Reconstructing Aesthetics of Budapest School. Harbin, China: Heilongjiang University Press, 2011.
 Fu Qilin, “On Budapest School Aesthetics: An Interview with Agnes Heller”, Thesis Eleven, 2008(Aug.), Num. 94 Vol.1
 Fu Qilin，“On Agnes Heller’s Theory of Imaginary Institution in Modernity”， Journal of Huaiyin Teachers' College, 2008, num.4.
 Gaiger, Jason. “The Fake: Forgery and its Place in Art by Sándor Radnóti”. British Journal of Aesthetics, Jul(2001), Vol. 41 Issue 3.
 Gardiner， Michael. “ A postmodern utopia?  Heller and Ferenc’s critique of Messianic Marxism”, in  Utopian Studies, vol. 8 no.1(1997), 89-122.
 Gardiner，Michael. Critique of Everyday Life. London and New York: Routledge, 2000.
 Gransow, Volker. “Heller, Agnes”, in Robert A. Gorman, ed. Biographical Dictionary of Neo-Marxism. Westport, Connecticut: Greenwood Press, 1985. 
 Grumley, John，Paul Crittenden and Pauline Johnson, ed. Culture and Enlightenment : Essays for Gyorgy Markus. Ashgate, Aldershot, 2002.
 Grumley, John. “Negotiating the ‘double bind’: Heller's theory of modernity", in European Journal of Social Theory, vol. 3, no. 4(2000),429-447.
 Grumley, John. Agnes Heller: A Moralist in the Vortex of History. London: Pluto Press, 2005.
 Hall, John A. “Beyond Justice by Agnes Heller ”, in The American Journal of Sociology, vol. 95, no. 5(1990), 1352–1354.
 Harrison, Paul R. “The Grandeur and Twilight of Radical Universalism, by Agnes Heller and Ferenc Fehér”, in Contemporary Sciology, vol. 21, Issue. 4 (1992), 539–540.
 Howard, W. “Heller, Agnes, Modernity’s pendulum, Thesis Eleven, 1992, 31, 1-13”, in Sociological Abstracts, Vol. 40, no. 5(1992). P. 2265.
 Kammas，Anthony. “Introducing Agnes Heller：The Radical Imagination of an unhappy consciousness”, in East European Politics and Societies, Vol.17, Num.4(2003), 712–718. 
 Köves, Margit. “Ferenc Fehér(1933-1994), Reflections on a Member of the Lukács School”, Social Scientist, Vol. 23, No. 4/6(Apr.-Jun., 1995), pp. 98–107.
 Löwy, Michael. “Introduction: Le bilan globalement négatif”, in Agnes Heller and Ferenc Feher, Marxisme et démocratie, trans. Anna Libera. Paris: Maspero, 1981.
 Lukács, George. "The Development of the Budapest School," The Times Literary Supplement, No. 3615 (June 11, 1971).
 Murphy, Peter. “Agnes Heller and Ferenc Feher, The Grandeur and Twilight of Radical Universalism”, in Theory and Society, vol. 22,  no. 4(1993), 569–575.
 Nordquist, J. “Agnes Heller and the Budapest School: A Bibliography”, Social Theory, n.59, 2000.
 Roberts, David. “Between Home and World: Agnes Heller’s the Concept of the Beautiful”, in Thesis Eleven, no. 59(1999), 95-101.
 Roucek，Joseph S. “The Humanization of Socialism: Writings of the Budapest School”, Social Forces, Vol.56, No.3(Mar.1978)
 Rundell, John. “The postmodern ethical condition: A conversation with Agnes Heller”, in Critical Horizons, vol.1, no.1(2000), 136–145.
 Shusterman, Rechard. “Saving Art from Aesthetics”, Poetics Today, Vol. 8, No. 3/4,(1987), 651–660.
 Simon Tormey, “Preface to the Book on Agnes Heller”, Comparative literature: east & west, 2007, num.8.
 Stalnaker, Nan. “ The Fake: Forgery and Its Place in Art by Sándor Radnóti”, The Philosophical Quarterly, Vol. 50, No. 200 Jul. (2000), 425–427.
 Tormey, Simon. Agnes Heller: Socialism, autonomy and the postmodern. Manchester and New York: Manchester University Press, 2001.
 Turner, Bryan S. “Can Modernity Survive? By Agnes Heller”, in Contemporary Sociology, Vol. 21, No. 1(Jan. 1992), 128–130.
 Vardys, V. Stanley. “The Humanization of Socialism: Writings of the Budapest School”. The American Political Science Review, Vol,73, No.2 (Jun. 1979).
 Waller, William. “Towards a Radical Democracy: The Political Economy of the Budapest School by Douglas M. Brown”, Social Science Journal, 1991, Vol. 28, Issue 4.
 Wolin, Richard. “A Radical Philosophy by Agnes Heller”, New German Critique, No. 38,  (Spring, 1986), 196–202.
 Wolin, Richard. “Agnes Heller on Everyday Life”, in Theory & Society, Vol. 16, Issue. 2(1987), 295–304.

Frankfurt School
Critical theory
Cultural studies
Historical schools
Marxist schools of thought
Social philosophy
Sociological theories